The list of tourist attractions in Vadodara, a city in Gujarat, India.

Laxmi Vilas Palace, Vadodara
Sayaji Baug
Sursagar Lake
Maharaja Fateh Singh Museum
Baroda Museum & Picture Gallery
Kirti Mandir, Vadodara
Kirti Stambh, Vadodara
Makarpura Palace
National Academy of Indian Railways
Nazarbaug Palace
Nyay Mandir
Hazira Maqbara
EME Temple
Canara Coffee House
Khanderao Market

Gallery

References

 
V
Lists of tourist attractions in Gujarat